Losing Ground may refer to:
 Losing Ground (book), a critique of welfare programs by Charles Murray published in 1984
 Losing Ground (1982 film), an American film by Kathleen Collins
 Losing Ground (2005 film), an American film by Bryan Wizemann
 "Losing Ground" (song), a 1997 song by Groove Terminator
 "Losing Ground", a song by Italian band Disarmonia Mundi, from The Isolation Game